The 1999 Women's World Snooker Championship was a women's snooker tournament. It was the 1999 edition of the World Women's Snooker Championship, first held in 1976.

The tournament was won by Kelly Fisher, who retained the title by defeating Karen Corr 4–2 in the final. The rounds before the semi-final were played at the Radion Executive Club, Sheffield, and the semi-finals and final were played at the Crucible Theatre.

Main Draw

References 

1999 in English sport
1999 in snooker
1999 in women's sport
International sports competitions hosted by England
1999